Doris G. Skillman Stockton (1924–2018) was an American mathematician specializing in partial differential equations and Banach spaces, and known for her many mathematics textbooks. For many years she was a professor of mathematics at the University of Massachusetts Amherst.

Education and career
Stockton entered the New Jersey College for Women at Rutgers in 1941. Initially planning to study dramatic arts, she was persuaded to switch to mathematics and physics so that she could more directly contribute to the World War II efforts.

She completed her Ph.D. at Brown University in 1958, with the dissertation Singular Parabolic Partial Differential Equations with Time Dependent Coefficients, supervised by Joanne Elliott.

She joined the faculty at the University of Connecticut but, soon after, moved to the University of Massachusetts. After working for 52 years on the faculty of the University of Massachusetts, Stockton retired in 2006.

Personal life
Stockton was born on February 9, 1924, in New Brunswick, New Jersey.
She was married to Frederick D. Stockton (1920–2015), an associate professor of civil engineering at the University of Massachusetts.
She died on December 13, 2018, in Avon, Connecticut.

Books
Stockton was the author of 11 textbooks and workbooks, including:
Elements of Mathematics (2nd ed., with Helen Murray Roberts, 1956)
Essential Mathematics (Scott & Foresman, 1972)
Essential Algebra (1973)
Essential Algebra with Functions (1973)
Essential Algebra and Trigonometry (Houghton Mifflin, 1978)
Essential Precalculus (Houghton Mifflin, 1978)
Essential College Algebra (Houghton Mifflin, 1979)

References

1924 births
2018 deaths
20th-century American mathematicians
American women mathematicians
Mathematics educators
Rutgers University alumni
Brown University alumni
University of Connecticut faculty
University of Massachusetts Amherst faculty
20th-century American women
21st-century American women